Wingspan is a board game designed by Elizabeth Hargrave and published by Stonemaier Games in 2019. It is a card-driven,  board game in which players compete to attract birds to their wildlife reserves. During the game's development process, Hargrave constructed personal charts of birds observed in Maryland, with statistics sourced from various biological databases; the special powers of birds were also selected to resemble real-life characteristics. Upon its release, Wingspan received critical and commercial acclaim for its gameplay, accurate thematic elements, and artwork. The game also won numerous awards, including the 2019 Kennerspiel des Jahres. Several expansions and a digital edition have been subsequently published.

Gameplay
In Wingspan, players spend food resources to add birds, which are represented by 170 individually illustrated cards, to the forest, prairie, and wetland habitats on their player boards. Each habitat is associated with a different player action: gaining food resources to pay for birds, laying eggs on birds, or drawing cards. Over the course of four rounds, players take turns activating the habitats on their player boards or adding new birds. As birds are added to a habitat, the basic action of gaining food, laying eggs, or drawing cards associated with that habitat is improved. Additionally, some birds have special abilities that are activated when a player uses their habitat.

At the end of the game, players score points for the birds on their board, objectives achieved during each round and throughout the game, eggs accumulated, food stored on cards, and cards stored under cards. The player with the most points wins.

Development
Wingspan was designed by Elizabeth Hargrave, a health consultant in Silver Spring, an amateur birder, and a former policy analyst for NORC at the University of Chicago. The game was inspired by Hargrave's visits to Lake Artemesia near her home in Maryland. Hargrave stated that she selected the theme because "there were too many games about castles and space, and not enough games about things I'm interested in". During her visits, she would create personal charts of the birds she observed there, with the size of the dataset reaching 596 rows by 100 columns. The special powers afforded by the birds in the game closely resemble the unique characteristics of the actual birds documented by Hargrave's efforts, with statistics on the diet, habitat, status, and wingspan of birds sourced from the Cornell Lab of Ornithology, the IUCN Red List, and National Audubon Society. 

Hargrave pitched the concept for Wingspan to Stonemaier Games in 2016, a company from St. Louis which previously published Viticulture and Scythe. The game concept for Wingspan interested Jamey Stegmaier, president of Stonemaier Games, who stated that "[there's] something about birds that instantly captures a human desire to collect, sort, and admire". Stegmaier also praised the engine building mechanism, describing that "[the] key for me wasn’t the birds, but the satisfying feeling of collecting beautiful things". The game's artwork, which included 170 cards, was hand-drawn by Ana Maria Martinez Jaramillo, Natalia Rojas, and Beth Sobel.

Awards and nominations

Reception

Critical reviews
Wingspan received widespread acclaim upon release. The game's action system was praised by Matt Thrower from IGN, who described it as "an excruciating balance between adding birds, feeding them and scoring points". The review also positively commented on the game's replayability as each bird card is unique. Stuart West from Nature agreed, noting the replay value of each game due to the unique powers of the bird cards and bonus cards. The strategic decisions for the game were also praised. The diverse interconnections of the bird abilities were commented on by Dan Kois from Slate, which stated that the birds were "knitted together into a web of complex, mutually beneficial relationships" as the game progresses. Similarly, Angela Chuang from Science described the engine building mechanisms as "compelling", and their resemblance to community ecology. Writing for the New Scientist, Dino Motti listed Wingspan as one of the nine best science-themed board games and described the game as containing "hundreds of beautifully illustrated bird cards with special abilities that synergise as they inhabit a range of environments". 

Wingspan's accessibility was strongly praised, with Saif Al-Azzawi of the Los Angeles Times commenting on the game's accessibility, stating that it "strikes the perfect balance between strategy and ease". The Guardian, in a review of STEM-based games, noted the game's accessibility, stating that "it deserves to be a hit". The game's theme was positively received as increasing accessibility, with Kois noting its appeal with a wide variety of demographics. Stuart West and Aaron Zimmerman from Ars Technica also praised the game's accessibility.

The component quality of Wingspan and its theme were well received. Stuart West described it as "an obvious labour of love", describing the egg components as "dainty, pastel-hued" and the bird cards as "superbly drawn". Vox reviewer Brian Anderson praised the quality, describing the art as "field guide-caliber illustrations" and praised the "tactile elements" of the birdhouse. Similarly,  Zimmerman praised the components and artwork as "lavishly produced". The New York Times also complimented the game's illustrations and components, including the pastel eggs, which was described as "enticing as Jordan almonds", and the birdhouse. The game's theme was described to "flow elegantly from the biology" by Nature and "committed to scientific integrity" according to Brian Anderson who also commented on the game's use of well-known bird guides and of the Cornell Lab of Ornithology database. In The New York Times, Siobhan Roberts observed the "scientific integrity" of the game.

However, not all aspects of Wingspan were positively received. Kois critiqued the balance, stating that towards the end of the game, laying eggs is the only preferable strategy. This sentiment was shared by Zimmerman, who criticised the possibly "overpowered" action of laying eggs that resulted in the game's ending to be "one-note". Furthermore, despite praising the accessibility, Zimmerman said that he preferred "a little more crunch in the decision-making", and also described the lack of player interaction.

Sales
Wingspan was positively received commercially and sold 44,000 copies worldwide over three printings in its first two months of release, with the publisher issuing a public apology for not having more copies available. The game had sold around 200,000 copies worldwide by the end of 2019. By March 2021, sales of Wingspan had reached 600,000 and 1.3 million by September 2021, which is the highest number of copies sold for Stonemaier Games.

Expansions 
Wingspan European Expansion, the first expansion for Wingspan, was published in 2019 and added 81 new bird cards, end of round goals, and bonus cards. This expansion also included new mechanisms and bird powers, such as birds which benefit from extra food and powers which trigger at the end of the round. A "swift-start promo pack" was also released in 2019, which added 10 new bird cards, intended for first time players.

The second expansion, Wingspan Oceania Expansion, which focuses on birds from Australia and New Zealand, was published in late 2020. The Oceania Expansion included 95 new bird cards, end of round goals, player mats, and a new food type called nectar. 

The latest expansion, Wingspan Asia, focuses on birds from China, India and Japan and was published in late 2022. This new expansion includes 90 new bird cards, 14 bonus cards, 18 Automa cards and two more ways to play: Duet mode (stand-alone variant for 2 players) and Flock mode allowing up to 7 players.

Adaptations 

The first digital versions of the game were released in 2020 on Steam and Switch, with Android and iOS versions also released in 2021. According to Slate, as of August 2021, Wingspan had sold 125,000 combined copies of digital editions on the platforms combined. A video game edition for Wingspan European Expansion was also later released. The adaptation received generally favourable reviews and was praised for its visuals and soundtrack.

References

External links
 

Biology-themed board games
Birds in popular culture
Board games introduced in 2019
Kennerspiel des Jahres winners